Chah Morgh (also Romanized as Chāh Morgh) is a village in Ahmadi Rural District, Ahmadi District, Hajjiabad County, Hormozgan Province, Iran. At the 2006 census, its population was 54, in 10 families.

References 

Populated places in Hajjiabad County